= Argument by example =

An argument by example (also known as argument from example) is an argument in which a claim is supported by providing examples. Most conclusions drawn in surveys and carefully controlled experiments are arguments by example and generalization. Studies that analyze past speeches also draw conclusions by taking specific examples of communication and inferring generalizations from them.

Arguments from example may be difficult to recognize because they can look like mere illustration. For example:

Taxonomists use Latin words to classify various animals into such categories as kingdom, phylum, class, order, family, genus, and species. Thus, some species of bear are Ursus americanus (American black bear), Ursus arctos (brown bear), and Ursus maritimus (polar bear).

Though the above paragraph contains a common conclusion indicator word ("thus"), it nevertheless is merely illustrating a fact of taxonomy. However, this could be made into an argument.

Taxonomists use Latin words to classify various animals so that scientists who speak different languages can communicate discoveries more easily. For example, a French biologist might describe an interesting characteristic of ours blanc to a Greek biologist. The Greek biologist might then respond that she has noted a similar characteristic in πολική αρκούδα. If they had begun by calling the animal Ursus arctos, they might have saved time and avoided confusion.

In this case, the writer is trying to persuade the reader of the utility of taxonomy.

== See also ==
- Logic
